Sans Souci is a Southern Sydney suburb in the state of New South Wales, Australia. Sans Souci is 17 kilometres south of the Sydney central business district and lies across the local government areas of the Bayside Council and the Georges River Council. It is part of the St George area.

Sans Souci sits on the western shore of Botany Bay. Lady Robinsons Beach and Cook Park run along the eastern border. Kogarah Bay runs along the western border. Sans Souci is connected to Taren Point, in the Sutherland Shire, to the south, by the Captain Cook Bridge over the Georges River.

History
Sans Souci is a French term meaning "without care", in other terms, "no worries". The area between Cooks River and Georges River was originally known as Seven Mile Beach. It was changed to Lady Robinson's Beach in 1874 to honour the wife of Governor Sir Hercules Robinson. Cook Park is named after Samuel Cook, who advocated it as a public pleasure area.

Catherine Cooper was given a  grant in the area in 1830, where she and husband, Robert Cooper Junior, built a home. The Coopers later operated a distillery there; the land was known as Charlotte Point and then Rocky Point. 

Sans Souci took its name from a grand house built on Rocky Point Road on land bought in 1853, by Thomas Holt (1811–1888), a wool merchant and politician, for his German wife. It was named after Sansssouci in Potsdam, Germany, the summer palace of Frederick the Great, King of Prussia. However, Holt thought that the area was too isolated so he built another house at Marrickville, overlooking the Cooks River, which he called The Warren. He bred rabbits for hunting and kept exotic animals, including an alpaca on this property. In the 1860s, Holt sold his Sans Souci property to William Rust, who turned it into a popular hotel, despite its isolation.

A steam tram operated between Sans Souci and Kogarah in the 1890s which allowed people to enjoy bathing, boating and fishing. In 1937, a silent electric trolley bus was introduced that, until 1959, ran from Rockdale to Kogarah, Sans Souci and Dolls Point.

Kogarah to Sans Souci tram line

This steam tramway opened in 1887, and was replaced by an electric trolleybus service in 1937. It connected with trains at Kogarah station by way of a large balloon loop through the streets, then passed south down Rocky Point Road to Sans Souci, Sandringham and Dolls Point. Small depots at Sandringham and Kogarah serviced the line. The line was single track at each end with a double-track middle section down Rocky Point Road.

Commercial area

Sans Souci is a mostly residential area. A shopping strip is located on Rocky Point Road, near the intersection of Sandringham St, including The Party People, various fast food outlets and the post office. Another small group of shops is located at the intersection of Clareville Avenue and Russell Avenue, on the border with Dolls Point and Sandringham. It includes Sans Souci Library and a variety of small shops and retailers. Two primary schools are located in the suburb: Sans Souci Public and St Finbars.

Schools and churches
 Sans Souci Public School
 St Finbars Catholic School
 St George Christian School (Infants Campus)
 St Finbars Catholic Church
 St Andrews Anglican Church
 Sans Souci Baptist Church

Parks and recreation
 Cook Park, Sans Souci Park, Bona Park, Kendall Street Reserve, Claydon Reserve is a soccer field and playground
 St George Sailing Club, St George Motor Boat Club, Botany Bay Yacht Club
 Sans Souci Leisure Centre,

Population

Demographics

According to the 2016 census, there were 10,304 people usually reside in Sans Souci. 63.9% of people were born in Australia. The next most common countries of birth were Greece 4.0%, China 2.5%, Egypt 2.3%, England 1.8% and New Zealand 1.5%. 55.9% of people spoke only English at home. Other languages spoken at home included Greek 13.4%, Arabic 4.7%, Mandarin 2.4%, Macedonian 2.2% and Italian 1.9%. The most common responses for religious affiliation were Catholic 27.7%, Eastern Orthodox 21.0%, No Religion 15.1% and Anglican 11.5% .

Notable residents
 Michelle Ford – Swimmer 800 m freestyle champion at the 1980 Summer Olympics.
 Kostya Tszyu – Boxer and two time world junior welterweight champion.
 Sam Sparro – Grammy nominated singer.
 Kay Cottee AO – First woman to sail around the world non-stop and unassisted.

References

External links

  [CC-By-SA]

Suburbs of Sydney
Botany Bay
Georges River Council
Bayside Council